Katonaia is a genus of tephritid  or fruit flies in the family Tephritidae. Named after the Hungarian zoologist, Kalman Kittenberger's pseudonym, Katona.

Species
Katonaia aida Hering, 1938
Katonaia arushae Munro, 1935
Katonaia hemileopsis (Hering, 1947)

References

Tephritinae
Tephritidae genera
Diptera of Africa
Diptera of Europe